Three Stooges Fun-O-Rama is a 1959 feature-length Three Stooges compilation of several 1957-1959 Three Stooges shorts starring Moe Howard, Larry Fine, and Joe Besser. Ten of the sixteen shorts with Besser are offered in this compilation program, including:
Horsing Around (1957)
Rusty Romeos (1957)
Outer Space Jitters (1957)
Quiz Whizz (1958)
Fifi Blows Her Top (1958)
Pies and Guys (1958)
Sweet and Hot (1958)
Flying Saucer Daffy (1958)
Oil's Well That Ends Well (1958)
Triple Crossed (1959)

Notes
Each theater created its own program, selecting four to six shorts.

External links
Three Stooges Fun-O-Rama at threestooges.net

1959 films
The Three Stooges films
Films directed by Jules White
Columbia Pictures films
1959 comedy films
American black-and-white films
1950s English-language films
1950s American films